Estoloides perforata is a species of beetle in the family Cerambycidae. It was described by Henry Walter Bates in 1872. It is known from Curaçao, Mexico,  Trinidad, and Venezuela.

References

Estoloides
Beetles described in 1872